Disney+ Hotstar (also known as Hotstar) is an Indian subscription video on-demand over-the-top streaming service owned by Novi Digital Entertainment of Disney Star and operated by Disney Entertainment, both divisions of The Walt Disney Company, featuring domestic Indian film, television and sport content for India itself and its worldwide diaspora. It also includes imported content and serves Southeast Asia as well.

The brand was first introduced as Hotstar for a streaming service carrying content from Disney Star's local networks, including films, television series, live sports, and original programming, as well as featuring content licensed from third-parties such as HBO and Showtime among others. Amid the significant growth of mobile broadband in India, Hotstar quickly became the dominant streaming service in the country.

Following the acquisition of Star India's parent company 21st Century Fox by Disney in 2019, Hotstar was integrated with the company's new global streaming brand Disney+ as 'Disney+ Hotstar' in April 2020. The co-branded service added Disney+ original programming, and films and television series from its main content brands of Walt Disney Studios, Pixar, Marvel Studios, Lucasfilm, and National Geographic alongside the domestic and third-party content already carried on the platform.

Outside of India, the Disney+ Hotstar service also operates in Indonesia, Malaysia, and Thailand, where it similarly combines entertainment content licensed from local, third-party studios, with the larger Disney+ library. Disney+ Hotstar is also expected to launch in Vietnam in early 2023. In Singapore, Canada, and the United Kingdom, Hotstar operates as a streaming service targeting overseas Indians, focusing on Disney Star's domestic entertainment and sports content; Disney+ operates as a standalone service in these markets. In 2021, Disney announced that it would discontinue the U.S. version of Hotstar in November 2021, in favor of adding its content to the domestic Hulu and ESPN+ services instead.

History 

Star India officially launched Hotstar on 11 February 2015 after fifteen months of development, coinciding with the 2015 Cricket World Cup and the upcoming 2015 Indian Premier League (for which Star had acquired the streaming rights). The ad-supported service initially featured a library of over 35,000 hours of content in seven regional languages, as well as live streaming coverage of sports such as football and kabaddi, and cricket on a delay. Star CEO Sanjay Gupta felt that there "[weren't] many platforms available to Indian consumers offering high-quality, curated content besides, say, YouTube", and explained that the service would appeal most prominently to the growing young adult demographic, and feature "very targeted" advertising. He estimated that by 2020, the service could account for nearly a quarter of Star's annual revenue.

Hotstar generated at least 345 million views throughout the 2015 Cricket World Cup, and approximately over 200 million views during the 2015 Indian Premier League season. In April 2016, Hotstar launched a subscription tier primarily oriented towards international content and the possibility of premium sports content. The service launched alongside a new deal to carry HBO content uncut on the platform, with its introduction coinciding with the season 6 premiere of Game of Thrones.

The 2016 launch of the LTE-only wireless carrier Jio spurred the growth of mobile broadband in India, and was credited in turn for having bolstered the growth of streaming video in the country. While services of US origin such as Amazon Prime Video and Netflix saw some growth in the Indian market, Hotstar remained the dominant streaming service. By July 2017, Hotstar's apps had reached 300 million downloads, and it was reported as being the top video streaming app in the country.

In May 2018, it was reported that the service had 75100 million active users per-month. In September 2018, Hotstar CEO Ajit Mohan left to become the vice-president and managing director of Facebook India. That same month, it was reported that the service had begun to restructure its leadership to have separate executives for its ad-supported and premium services, and, aided by new funding from Star US Holdings, planned to increase its production of premium original content to better-compete with Amazon and Netflix, amidst concerns that the service was beginning to haemorrhage cash.

By 2019, the service had over 150 million active users monthly. In March 2019, ahead of the 2019 Indian Premier League, Hotstar migrated existing subscribers of its All Annual Sports plan to a new entry-level plan known as Hotstar VIP. Intended as an introductory option, it includes access to sports content (including the IPL, 2019 Cricket World Cup, and Premier League football), early access to serials before their television broadcast, and original series from the new Hotstar Specials banner. It is also payable via cash. Chief product officer Varun Narang described the offering as "a value proposition built with the Indian audience at the heart of it".

The 2019 Indian Premier League repeatedly broke records for concurrent viewership on Hotstar, with the 2019 final setting a new "global record" peak of 18.6 million. US website TechCrunch credited these gains to the extensive growth of internet usage in the country. This was surpassed during the semi-final of the 2019 Cricket World Cup between India and New Zealand, with 25.3 million. After the India-Pakistan match earlier in the tournament, Hotstar surpassed almost 100 million daily users.

Acquisition by Disney, integration with Disney+ 
Star, and in turn Hotstar, were acquired by The Walt Disney Company in 2019, as part of its acquisition of their US parent company 21st Century Fox.

During a February 2020 earnings call, Iger announced that its recently launched international streaming brand Disney+ and its original programming would be integrated into Hotstar as part of a re-launch on 29 March 2020. Iger stated that the service's launch—originally scheduled to coincide with the opening of the 2020 Indian Premier League—would take advantage of Hotstar's existing infrastructure and customer base. The Motley Fool described Hotstar as being Disney's "secret weapon" in the market, due to its already-dominant position.

Hotstar began to soft launch the expanded service for some users in March. On 20 March 2020, in recognition of the COVID-19 pandemic and associated postponement of the IPL season, the launch was pushed back to 3 April. The service officially launched with a "virtual red carpet premiere" of The Lion King and Disney+ series The Mandalorian, featuring actors Rana Daggubati, Katrina Kaif, Shraddha Kapoor, Hrithik Roshan, and Tiger Shroff participating in live interactions. The price of the Hotstar Premium service was also increased with the launch.

On 2 May 2020, Star announced that it would distribute the service for free to migrant workers in Singapore through 21 July, to improve morale amid their impact from COVID-19. In June 2020, Hotstar named Sunil Rayan, formerly of Google, as its new president.

In August 2020, Disney announced that it would begin extending the Disney+ Hotstar service to other territories, beginning with Indonesia. The company also announced that it would similarly use the branding Star (as originated from Star Asia) for general entertainment streaming services in markets outside of the United States. Unlike Disney+ Hotstar-branded services, however, the Star brand is used as an equivalent to Disney's U.S. streaming brand Hulu (which has less recognition outside of the U.S.), and generally consists of a content hub added to existing Disney+ services (unlike Disney+ Hotstar, which is based on Hotstar's platform). In Latin America, Star was released as a second service, Star+, which also features ESPN content.

In February 2023, Disney reported that Disney+ had a net loss of 2.4 million subscribers worldwide in the first fiscal quarter of 2023, with its loss of streaming rights to the IPL in India to Viacom18 being the main contributing factor.

In February 2023, it was reported that HBO original programming would be moving from Hotstar, possibly related to an announcement by Disney CEO Bob Iger regarding a restructuring and cutting $5.5 billion in costs at The Walt Disney Company. This was confirmed by the platform via a tweet the following month, announcing that HBO original programming would be removed from the platform from 31st March, including series such as Game of Thrones, its spinoff House of the Dragon, Succession and the ongoing series The Last of Us. While it has not been decided which streaming service the content would move to, it is speculated by analysts that it will be made available on Amazon Prime Video, where HBO Max original programming as well as films from the Warner Bros. Pictures library are already available.

Content 

Disney+ Hotstar's content library draws from Disney Star's television networks, including its entertainment networks and Star Sports. Imported content is drawn primarily from Walt Disney Studios and Walt Disney Television, and includes Disney+ original programming and the core Disney+ libraries of Disney (including Pixar), Marvel Studios, Lucasfilm (including the Star Wars franchises), and National Geographic. It also holds licensing agreements with other third-party content providers, such as streaming rights to first-run and library programming from HBO.

In July 2017, Hotstar gained domestic streaming rights to first-run and library programming from Showtime. Rights to new Showtime content later moved to Viacom18's Voot (a sister of Showtime via parent company Paramount Global). In October 2018, Hotstar partnered with Hooq to offer its content on its premium service, including rights to films and series from its co-owners Sony Pictures and Warner Bros., as well as its other content partners. The partnership ended following Hooq's liquidation in April 2020. The partnership with HBO ended in 2023.

Some early original content on the service included the news comedy program On Air With AIB, and CinePlay. In March 2019, the service launched a new premium original content brand, Hotstar Specials, with the first production being Roar of the Lion—a docudrama miniseries chronicling the Chennai Super Kings in the 2018 Indian Premier League. Hotstar stated that these series would be at least six episodes in length, be available in seven regional languages (Bengali, Hindi, Kannada, Malayalam, Marathi, Tamil, and Telugu) and focus on providing "big-scale, high-quality drama". Hotstar partnered with a large number of Indian filmmakers to produce series for the brand.

In June 2020, Hotstar announced that it would begin to offer direct-to-streaming premieres of Indian films under the "Disney+ Hotstar Multiplex" banner due to COVID-19-related cinema closures, beginning with Fox Star Studios' Dil Bechara on 24 July 2020, followed by The Big Bull, Lootcase, Khuda Haafiz, Laxmii, Bhuj: The Pride of India, Sadak 2, and Mookuthi Amman.

Device support and service features 
Hotstar allows users to stream on up to four devices concurrently depending on their plan, and downloads for offline viewing depending on individual content licenses. Most content is able to be streamed in resolutions up to 1080p. In April 2020, Hotstar started rolling out Dolby Digital 5.1 sound on Android TV, Apple TV, Fire TV, Fire HD, and Roku, and later 4K with HDR in August 2020, initially for Apple TV and Android TV devices.

In India, the service was previously offered with "VIP" and "Premium" subscription tiers, which were differentiated by their content libraries (with the Premium tier featuring more premium international series and films). In September 2021, Hotstar introduced a new plan structure based on device support and concurrent streams (more akin to that of Netflix), with "Mobile" allowing a single stream on a mobile device only, "Super" allowing streams on up to two devices simultaneously, and "Premium" allowing streaming on up to four devices simultaneously, and with 4K support. Under the new plan structure, the same content library became available to all Disney+ Hotstar subscribers regardless of tier.

Availability

North America and the United Kingdom 
On 4 September 2017, Star Sports acquired the entirety of the media rights to the Indian Premier League, with Hotstar acting as the international digital rightsholder. Hotstar launched an international subscription service in Canada and the United States, aimed towards providing its domestic Indian content and sports. Hotstar launched in the United Kingdom on 13 September 2018, to coincide with the 2018 Asia Cup.

On 4 January 2019, Star discontinued their international linear pay television channels in the United States (such as StarPlus), pivoting its focus in the region to Hotstar. On 31 August 2021, Disney announced that it would, in turn, discontinue Hotstar in the United States, in favour of hosting its sports and entertainment content on ESPN+ and Hulu respectively beginning 1 September. Annual subscribers who had not yet subscribed to Disney's streaming services were provided with an offer to receive the Disney Bundle (Disney+, ESPN+, and Hulu) at no cost for the remainder of their Hotstar subscription period. The shutdown was later scheduled for 30 November 2021.

Asia 
In August 2019, Disney CEO Bob Iger stated that plans were in place for expansion of Hotstar into Southeast Asia. In August 2020, it was announced that Disney+ Hotstar would launch in Indonesia on 5 September 2020, marking the unified service's first expansion outside of India. On 19 October 2020, Star India announced the launch of Hotstar in Singapore, which took place on 1 November 2020. On 25 February 2021, it was reported that Disney+ Hotstar would launch in Malaysia and Thailand in 2021. The service launched in Malaysia on 1 June 2021, and Thailand on 30 June. There was a report stating the service was expected to launch in Vietnam in early 2023.This service was launched in May 2023 at the latest before this service has cooperated with Cat Tien Sa Company to reproduce Vietnam Idol.

In addition to content from Disney's library, the Southeast Asian versions of Disney+ Hotstar also had a large focus on domestic acquisitions. In Indonesia, Hotstar reached content supply agreements with studios such as Falcon Pictures, MD Pictures, Rapi Films, Soraya Intercine Films, Screenplay Films, and Starvision Plus among others, and also acquired first-run direct-to-streaming releases (which are being marketed as Hotstar Originals). To appeal to the local Indian ethnicity population, the service also carries Bollywood films subtitled and/or dubbed into the Indonesian language.

The Malaysian version of the service has similarly reached deals with studios such as Skop Productions, Revolution Media Films, Primeworks Studios, WAU Animation, Act 2 Pictures, Les’ Copaque Production and Red Films to carry films on the platform, with some being released direct-to-streaming. The Thai version reached agreements with studios and broadcasters such as GDH, GMM 25, Kantana Group, One 31, and Sahamongkolfilm, and has licensed content from other East Asian regions such as China, Hong Kong, Japan, South Korea, and Taiwan.

In January 2022, Disney+ Hotstar announced that it had acquired rights to WWE Network in Indonesia, with its content and live events becoming available on the platform at no additional charge.

Censorship 
The HBO series Last Week Tonight faced several instances of censorship on Hotstar since the purchase of the service by Disney; two episodes were edited to remove jokes referencing Disney characters, including a November 2019 episode on the US census relating to a PSA featuring Mickey Mouse (where Oliver claimed the character was a "crack addict"; a scene was also cropped to obscure a graphic relating to the joke), and a remark about Donald Duck's penis being "shaped like a corkscrew" during an episode discussing China's one-child policy. In February 2020, Hotstar refused to carry an episode that contained segments critical of Indian prime minister Narendra Modi, which had alleged that his policy of Hindu nationalism was a growing threat to democracy in India.

The programme's host John Oliver addressed all three instances of censorship by Hotstar in the 8 March 2020 episode. He placed a larger emphasis on the censorship of Disney references, however (alluding to his role of Zazu in Disney's 2019 CGI remake of The Lion King), jokingly arguing that he resented the censorship of his "factually accurate" Donald Duck joke more than the Modi episode being pulled.

The service was highly criticised and ridiculed upon its launch in Thailand for the censorship and editing of Disney content, where violent and/or suggestive scenes were cut out or blurred, with a majority of titles being cropped to fit 16:9 widescreen televisions and/or also sped up to 25 frames per second (PAL). On 14 July 2021, during a live podcast hosted by Thai news reporter Jomquan Laopetch, Disney Southeast Asia and Thailand general manager, direct-to-consumer Winradit Kolasastraseni stated that he was aware of the issues and admitted they were the QC team's fault; the service has been replacing censored/edited video files with their original cuts since then.

Notes

References

External links 
 

Disney+
Internet television streaming services
Self-censorship
Disney Star
Star Sports
Subscription video on demand services